Milton "Young Blood" Smith Jr.  (July 6, 1906 – February 4, 1972) was an American baseball catcher in the Negro leagues. He played with the St. Louis Giants in 1925 and 1927 and the Indianapolis ABCs in 1925.

External links
 and Seamheads

St. Louis Giants players
Indianapolis ABCs players
1906 births
1972 deaths
Baseball catchers
Baseball players from Mississippi
Sportspeople from Meridian, Mississippi
20th-century African-American sportspeople